Paul Ben-Victor (born July 24, 1965) is an American character actor. He is best known for playing Greek mobster Spiros "Vondas" Vondopoulos on the HBO drama series The Wire, Alan Gray in Entourage (2005–2008), and Ray in Body Parts (1991).

Early life 
Ben-Victor was born in Brooklyn, New York, the son of Leah Kornfeld, a playwright, and Victor Friedman. He attended Midwood High School, graduating in 1986.

Career 
Ben-Victor debuted on the small screen in 1987 in the television film Blood Vows: The Story of a Mafia Wife and on an episode of Cagney & Lacey. He was cast in important roles on HBO dramas The Wire (as mobster Spiros "Vondas" Vondopoulos) and Entourage, as well as making a 2006 appearance as Coach Lou on My Name Is Earl. He portrayed Moe Howard in the 2000 television film The Three Stooges.

Ben-Victor has been featured on many television cop dramas like FBI, Monk and CSI, and also had a recurring role as two-bit con man Steve Richards on three episodes of NYPD Blue from 1994 to 1997. He also appeared as Steve Richards on a 1998 episode of the short-lived police drama Brooklyn South.

Ben-Victor had a starring role in the Sci-Fi channel television show The Invisible Man, alongside Vincent Ventresca. The two later guest starred together on the hit TV show Las Vegas. They were reunited again on an episode of the new USA Network series In Plain Sight ("Hoosier Daddy"), on which Ben-Victor has a supporting role.

Paul has roles in the films The Irishman (2019), The Banker (2020), and Last Looks (2022).

He has co-written stage plays with his mother, including Club Soda and The Good Steno.

Filmography

Film

Television

References

External links 

1965 births
Living people
20th-century American male actors
21st-century American male actors
American male film actors
American male television actors
Jewish American male actors
Male actors from New York City
Midwood High School alumni
People from Brooklyn
Carnegie Mellon University College of Fine Arts alumni